No Defense is a 1921 American silent drama film directed by William Duncan and starring Duncan, Edith Johnson and Jack Richardson.

Cast
 William Duncan as John Manning
 Edith Johnson as Ethel Austin
 Jack Richardson as Frederick Apthorpe
 Henry Hebert as Milton Hulst
 Mathilde Brundage as Mrs. Austin
 Charles Dudley as MacRoberts

References

Bibliography
 Rainey, Buck. Sweethearts of the Sage: Biographies and Filmographies of 258 actresses appearing in Western movies. McFarland & Company, 1992.

External links
 

1921 films
1921 drama films
1920s English-language films
American silent feature films
Silent American drama films
American black-and-white films
Vitagraph Studios films
Films directed by William Duncan
1920s American films